Benjamin Renia (born 7 March 1990) is a French slalom canoeist who has competed at the international level since 2008.

He won a gold medal in the K1 team event at the 2021 World Championships in Bratislava.

World Cup individual podiums

References

External links

Living people
French male canoeists
Medalists at the ICF Canoe Slalom World Championships
1990 births